Dr. Babasaheb Ambedkar College of Arts, Commerce and Science, is an undergraduate and postgraduate, coeducational college situated in Bramhapuri, Maharashtra. It was established in the year 1972. The college is affiliated with Dr. Babasaheb Ambedkar Marathwada University.

Departments

Science
Physics
Mathematics
Chemistry
Botany
Zoology
Computer Science
Library and Information Science

Arts and Commerce
Marathi
English
Pali
History
Political Science
Ambedkar Thought
Music
Economics
Sociology
Commerce

Accreditation
The college is  recognized by the University Grants Commission (UGC).

References

External links

Dr. Babasaheb Ambedkar Marathwada University
Universities and colleges in Maharashtra
Educational institutions established in 1972
1972 establishments in Maharashtra